Aristida stricta is a warm-season grass, native to North America, that dominates understory vegetation in sandhills and flatwoods coastal plain ecosystems of the Carolinas in the Southeastern United States. It is known as wiregrass (due to its texture) and pineland three-awn grass.

Its common name, wiregrass, gave rise to the naming of the Wiregrass Region in which it is located.

This is a fast-growing species that regenerates quickly after fires. The plant depends on regular summer burning in order to stimulate flowering and seed production.

References

 

stricta
Flora of North Carolina
Flora of South Carolina
Flora of Florida
Flora of Georgia (U.S. state)